Kelmė (is a city in northwestern Lithuania, a historical region of Samogitia. It has a population of 8,206 and is the administrative center of the Kelmė District Municipality.

History
Kelmė's name may come from the Lithuanian kelmynės, literally: the stubby place, because of the forests that were there at the time of its founding.

Kelmė was first mentioned in 1416, the year that Kelmė's first church was built.

Prior to World War II, Kelmė was home to a famous Rabbinical College, the Kelm Talmud Torah.

According to an 1897 census, 2,710 of Kelme's 3,914 inhabitants were members of the town's Jewish population, the vast majority of whom were merchants and traders and lived in the town.

Most of the Jews in Kelmė rural district were murdered during a mass execution on July 29, 1941. On August 22 a second mass execution occurred. On October 2, 1941, some Kelmė and Vaiguva Jews were murdered in Žagarė. The executions were committed by Lithuanians nazis, auxiliary police and Germans soldiers.
In total, the number of victims is 1,250-1,300 people.

Gallery

People
 Aryeh Leib Frumkin (1845–1916), Rabbi
 Bronius Laucevičius-Vargšas (1884–1916), writer
 Antanas Mackevičius (1828–1863), Roman Catholic priest involved in Uprising of 1863
 Icchokas Meras (1934–2014), writer
 Zvi Yaakov Oppenheim (1883–1926), Rabbi
 Simcha Zissel Ziv (1824–1898), the Alter of Kelm

References

External links

 Official site of Kelmė district municipality

 
Cities in Lithuania
Cities in Šiauliai County
Municipalities administrative centres of Lithuania
Rossiyensky Uyezd
Shtetls
Holocaust locations in Lithuania
Kelmė District Municipality